The 1978 Cork Junior Hurling Championship was the 81st staging of the Cork Junior Hurling Championship since its establishment by the Cork County Board. 

On 5 November 1978, Mayfield won the championship following a 2-08 to 0-03 defeat of Carritwohill in the final at Páirc Uí Chaoimh in Cork. It was their first ever championship title.

Results

Final

References

Cork Junior Hurling Championship
Cork Junior Hurling Championship